HMS Cockatrice was a six-gun schooner, the name ship of her class, built for the Royal Navy during the 1830s. She was sold for scrap in 1858.

Description
The ship's tonnage was 181 78/94 tons burthen. The Cockatrice class was armed with two 6-pounder cannon and four 12-pounder carronades. The ships had a crew of 33–42 officers and ratings.

Construction and career
Cockatrice, the second ship of her name to serve in the Royal Navy, was ordered on 11 September 1828, laid down in July 1831 at Pembroke Dockyard, Wales, and launched on 14 May 1832. She was completed on 15 September 1832 at Plymouth Dockyard.

Citations

References

Cockatrice-class schooners
1832 ships
Ships built in Pembroke Dock